Aluto (also known as Alutu) is a dormant stratovolcano in Ethiopia, located in the Ethiopian Rift Valley in southern Oromia region between Lake Langano and Lake Ziway. It is the site of the Aluto–Langano Geothermal Power Station.

Geology 
It features numerous vents along E-W and NNW-SSE trending fissures which converge at the coordinates of the volcano center, which is the center of a hypothesized caldera surrounded by rims, visible especially in the south and west. The largest vent is 1 km × 0.5 km in size just SE of the volcano center and along the SE rim of the volcano. The volcano covers a surface area of appr. 25 km2. The silicic volcano center has an eruption history of more than 500,000 years, the last eruption was around 2400 years ago. Eruptions from Aluto may have influenced the dispersal of hominin populations in East Africa.

Strong fumarolic activity continues throughout today. The volcano is permanently inflating and deflating with the strongest movements at the center of the  hypothesized caldera, indicating some activity around 5 km below the volcano.

Close to the center of the hypothetical caldera is the site of the high-temperature Aluto–Langano geothermal field with temperatures between 300 and 400 °C at depths below 1,200 meters. This geothermal field covers an area of about 8 km2.

The field is also the site of the Aluto–Langano Geothermal Power Station, a pilot power plant to explore geothermal energy in Ethiopia.

See also
List of stratovolcanoes
List of volcanoes in Ethiopia

References

External links

Alutu volcano

Mountains of Ethiopia
Stratovolcanoes of Ethiopia
Calderas of Ethiopia
Pleistocene stratovolcanoes
Holocene stratovolcanoes